Jan Beneš (born 9 October 1971) is a Czech rower. He competed in the men's eight event at the 1992 Summer Olympics.

References

1971 births
Living people
Czech male rowers
Olympic rowers of Czechoslovakia
Rowers at the 1992 Summer Olympics
Place of birth missing (living people)